Patrick Baumann (born 8 January 1982) is a Swiss former professional association football player.

In summer 2006, he signed a 1-year contract with FC Thun. But since the second half of the season was excluded in the squad. In 2007–08 season he joined 1. Liga side Grenchen, as Kurt Baumann the head coach of the team is his father.

He was the member of Swiss U21 team at 2004 UEFA European Under-21 Football Championship.

References

External links
 Player profile at Swiss Football League 
 

1982 births
Living people
Swiss men's footballers
Switzerland under-21 international footballers
Swiss Super League players
Grasshopper Club Zürich players
FC Winterthur players
FC Zürich players
Neuchâtel Xamax FCS players
FC Thun players
Association football midfielders